P. Kunjanandan Nair (February 15, 1916 – January 28, 2001), better known by his pseudonym, Thikkodiyan, was an Indian playwright, novelist, lyricist and screenwriter  of Malayalam. He was known for his contributions to the genre of radio plays and his autobiography, Arangu Kaanatha Nadan (The actor who had never been on stage), which detailed the socio-cultural development of Malabar in the post-independent period, fetched him a number of awards including the Kendra Sahithya Academy Award, Kerala Sahitya Akademi Award for Biography and Autobiography, Vayalar Award and the Odakkuzhal Award.

Biography 
Thikkodiyan was born P. Kunjanandan Nair, on February 15, 1916, at Thikkodi, a small hamlet in Kozhikode district, of the south Indian state of Kerala, to Puthiyedath Kunjappa Nair and P. Narayani Amma. He lost his parents while he was boy and was brought up by his grandfather, who was a theatre enthusiast. After schooling at Basel Mission Middle School, Koyilandy, he completed a teachers'training course and started his career as a teacher at his alma mater in 1936. There, he became involved in trade union activities and he was expelled from service when he participated in a strike in 1938. Later, he became associated with the Bharat Seva Sangham and the Devadhar Malabar Reconstruction Trust where he worked alongside K. Kelappan and V. R. Nayanar and was also involved in Nayanar Balika Sadanam, an orphanage founded by Nayanar in 1942. It was during this time, he joined Dinaprabha daily and worked there until 1948. In 1950, he moved to the All India Radio as a script writer, and spent the rest of his official career there to superannuate from service in 1979 as a drama producer.

Thikkodiyan married Parvathy in 1942 and the couple had a daughter, Pushpa. He died at his residence in Kozhikode on January 28, 2001, at the age of 84.

Legacy 
P. Kunhananandan Nair began his literary career using the pen name Anand and his first poem, Veendum Karayatte was published in Mathrubhumi. Later, he wrote satires and noted humourist, Sanjayan, who published a few of them in Vishwadeepam weekly, suggested the pseudonym, Thikkodiyan which he assumed for the rest of his career. He took to writing plays in the early 1950s, while serving as a scriptwriter at the Kozhikode station of the All India Radio. His friends, Uroob, S. K. Pottekkatt. N. V. Krishna Warrier, M. V. Devan, V. Abdulla and K. A. Kodungalloor encouraged him to write a play and he wrote Jeevitham, which won a prize in a drama competition conducted by the Kendra Kala Samithy. It was the first of his plays, numbering over, 25, such as Pazhaya Bandham, Attupoya Kanni, Pushpavrishti, Mahabharatham and Kanyadanam. Apart from plays, he had also written novels, including Chuvanna Kadal, Aswahridayam and Pazhassiyude Padavaal. Drawn against the background of the sea and the Portuguese invasion, Chuvanna Kadal was among the major historical novels in Malayalam. He was considered among the major writers of radio plays in Malayalam literature. He made a foray into cinema, writing the story, screenplay and dialogues for Kunchako's 1964 film, Pazhassi Raja and he write the screenplay and dialogues for five more films which included Uttarayanam, the debut film of the award-winning director, G. Aravindan. Two other films, Nrithasala and Ithiri Poove Chuvanna Poove were based on his stories. He also wrote a song, Appolum Paranjillee, for the movie, Kadamba for which the music was scored by K. Raghavan.

Thikkodiyan, who was a part of a group of Kozhikode-based litterateurs, was also among the group of writers who regularly gathered in Vaikkom Muhammad Basheer's house in Beypore along with Uroob, M. V. Devan and M. T. Vasudevan Nair. He was known to have assisted many stage and film actors, such as Kunhandi and Balan K. Nair, in developing their careers. His autobiography. Arangu Kaanatha Nadan (The Actor Who Had Never Been on Stage), is considered one of the best among autobiographies written in Malayalam and the book fetched him several major literary awards.

Awards
Thikkodiyan shared the 1974 Kerala State Film Award for Best Screenplay with G. Aravindan for the film, Uttarayanam, which was the first of his several major awards. In 1992, his autobiography, Arangu Kaanaatha Nadan, was selected for the Kerala Sahitya Akademi Award for Biography and Autobiography; the same year, the book also won the Odakkuzhal Award. Three years later, the book fetched him two more awards, the 1995 Kendra Sahitya Akademi Award and the Vayalar Award (1995). The Kerala Sahitya Akademi inducted him as a distinguished fellow in  2000 and he received the inaugural Mathrubhumi Literary Award in 2001, the year of his death. He was also a recipient of the Deviprasadam Trust Award, and Samastha Kerala Sahithya Parishad Award.

Bibliography

Plays

Novels

Memoirs, essays, short stories, poetry

Filmography

See also 

 List of Malayalam-language authors by category
 List of Malayalam-language authors

Notes

References

Further reading

External links 
 
 
 
 
 

Indian male dramatists and playwrights
Indian male novelists
Dramatists and playwrights from Kerala
People from Kozhikode district
Malayalam-language writers
Malayalam-language dramatists and playwrights
Malayalam novelists
1916 births
2001 deaths
Recipients of the Sahitya Akademi Award in Malayalam
Recipients of the Kerala Sahitya Akademi Award
Kerala State Film Award winners
All India Radio people
20th-century Indian novelists
20th-century Indian dramatists and playwrights
Novelists from Kerala
20th-century Indian male writers
Recipients of the Kerala Sangeetha Nataka Akademi Fellowship